Gethin Robinson (born 5 October 1982, Cardiff) is a Welsh rugby union player. A prop forward, he played his club rugby for Newport Gwent Dragons. He was released by Newport Gwent Dragons at the end of the 2011–12 season and joined Newport RFC

References

External links
Newport Gwent Dragons profile

Rugby union players from Cardiff
Welsh rugby union players
Dragons RFC players
Newport RFC players
1982 births
Living people
Rugby union props